The Barclay Manufacturing Company was an American metal toy company based in New Jersey that specialised in diecast toy cars and hollowcast toy soldiers. Due to their common availability at five and dime stores, collectors often refer to Barclay's toy soldiers as "Dimestore soldiers".

History
Barclay Manufacturing was formed by Leon Donze and Michael Levy in about 1922.. The name of the company came from Barclay Street in Hoboken, New Jersey. During the 1930s, the company was later based in North Bergen, New Jersey.

In its heyday Barclay produced 500,000 toys a week, making them the largest toy soldier manufacturer at that time in the United States. In 1939 Barclay acquired another toy soldier company, Tommy Toy and its art deco sculptor Olive Kooken. Soldier's uniforms followed military fashion of the times, replacing closed standing collars with open ones with shirt and tie. Wrap around puttees were replaced by canvas leggings. Prior to the company's temporary closing in 1942 the foot soldiers were purchased individually for a nickel.

Some of Barclay's first vehicles were slush cast white metal made in the 1930s. Some of the most interesting models were in art deco style. One intriguing selection was a "Coast to Coast" art deco style bus – another a two tone oil tanker with pontoon fenders – on both models, fenders were different colors from the bodies. One available set had a cartoon-like strip on the box lid that stated it was a "Build and Paint Your Own Auto Set" which was "Loads of fun". The set included a four-door sedan, a two-door, and a tanker truck. It included paint and the cars had white rubber wheels.

Also about this time, and into the 1940s, the company made a variety of military vehicles – tanks, trucks with cannon and other cars painted brown.

Post World War II

Soldiers
After World War II, Barclay's headquarters were relocated to Union City, New Jersey. Despite the inroads of plastic toy soldiers, Barclay kept manufacturing theirs in metal. Following the war, Barclay changed the helmets on their soldiers to the M1 Helmet. In about 1951 Barclay conserved metal by eliminating bases on their soldiers, which collectors nicknamed podfoot soldiers because each foot appeared as a flattened rounded blob. These were painted similar to figures in American comic books of the time – olive drab uniforms with green helmets with "enemy" soldiers in red uniforms with white helmets. With the rising cost of metal, the soldiers had risen in price to 15 cents.

Though cruder than European offerings, such as Britains, Barclays soldiers had a verve and energy that was popular with American youth. Cast figures on motorcycles with generalized, but non-moving rings for wheels, exuded speed and were simple but very effective toys.

In 1960, the lead soldiers were generally removed from Woolworths and other dimestores and more commonly found for sale in hobby shops. From 1964 the soldiers' uniforms were painted in green to reflect the modern US Army.

The ones with pinched axles
In the 1950s and 1960s, Barclay's diecast metal vehicles continued in popularity. Common sizes were vehicles just over 1 inch long, but others were 3 to 4 inches. A variety of cars were produced like a tiny VW Beetle and some sports and racing cars, often with tiny metal drivers. Some generic trucks appeared as well. One clever compact set was a car carrier with folding ramp and four cars. Another was a tall-nosed GM Motorama-style pickup carrying nine wooden 'beer' barrels. This same truck also appeared in a white 'milk and ice cream' version. 

Barclay cars are recognizable for their simple single cast bodies, somewhat like miniature Tootsietoys, though distinct from that company, some Barclay models had drivers separately cast in metal and painted then put in proper position in the vehicles. The vehicles were adorned with neither windows nor interiors. Notable were the vehicles' pinched flat axles that protruded rather boldly from the wheels (something that safety standards would likely not allow today). Cars were painted a variety of colors – especially bright blues, reds, and oranges.

One line produced around 1960 was the 'Bottle Series' Metal Miniatures. Barclay's tiny vehicles were placed in a small blister card covered with clear plastic in the form of a bottle. On one side of the package, a skyscraper was illustrated – on the other side, a country lane. The entire package was only slightly smaller than 4 x 2.75 inches. There was no decoration or writing on the cardboard back of the package. At the bottom of the package was boldly written 'All American', each letter in a square each alternating red and blue (and somewhat reminiscent of wooden letter blocks lined up). Perhaps this slogan emphasized that these toys were not made in England (like Matchbox or Budgie) or any other country. The bottle series were priced at 19 cents.

Turbulent times
The 1960s would prove to be a turbulent time for the "old line" toy manufacturers. Before the decade was over, the A.C. Gilbert Company and Lionel, both legends in the toy world, would be gone. Marx was severely crippled.

Barclay ceased trading in 1971 due to an inability to compete with plastics and the rapidly changing market (e.g. Mattel Hot Wheels), not because of issues regarding lead, which has been a popular misconception.

Legacy
The old firm's trademark rights were re-acquired in the 1990s, and now The Barclay Company once again manufactures solid metal reproductions of Barclay and Manoil Manufacturing Co. figures.

References
 
 Melton, Howard W. and Wagner, Robert E.  2004.  Barclay Toys: Transports and Cars 1932–1971.  Schiffer Publishing.
 O'Brien, Richard.  1986.  The Barclay Catalog Book: Material from the Barclay Archives. Richard O'Brien publishing.
 Pielin, Don; Norman Joplin and Verne Johnson.  2001.  American Dimestore Toy Soldiers and Figures.  Schiffer Books.

Footnotes

External links
 The Barclay Company

Defunct toy manufacturers
Toy brands
Model manufacturers of the United States
Manufacturing companies established in 1922
Toy soldier manufacturing companies
Companies based in Hudson County, New Jersey
Defunct companies based in New Jersey
Manufacturing companies disestablished in 1971
1922 establishments in New Jersey
1971 disestablishments in New Jersey
American companies disestablished in 1971